Gun Law is a 1933 American pre-Code
Western film directed by Lewis D. Collins and starring Jack Hoxie, Betty Boyd and Mary Carr. It was remade in 1937 as Melody of the Plains.

Plot summary

Cast
 Jack Hoxie as The Sonora Kid 
 Betty Boyd as Nita Hammond 
 Mary Carr as Mother Andrews 
 Paul Fix as Tony Andrews 
 Harry Todd as Blackjack 
 J. Frank Glendon as Nevada Smith 
 Otto Lederer as the barber 
 William P. Burt as Jake Lawson - banker 
 Bob Burns as Marshal Jim Hawkins 
 Edmund Cobb as Tex - henchman

References

Bibliography
 Pitts, Michael R. Poverty Row Studios, 1929–1940: An Illustrated History of 55 Independent Film Companies, with a Filmography for Each. McFarland & Company, 2005. .

External links
 
 
 
 

1933 Western (genre) films
American Western (genre) films
Films directed by Lewis D. Collins
Majestic Pictures films
1930s American films